

Hans-Joachim Kahler (21 March 1908 – 14 January 2000) was a German general during World War II.  He was a recipient of the Knight's Cross of the Iron Cross with Oak Leaves.

Awards and decorations
 Iron Cross (1939) 2nd Class (3 July 1940) & 1st Class (3 September 1941)
 Knight's Cross of the Iron Cross with Oak Leaves
 Knight's Cross on 14 April 1943 as Major and commander of Kradschützen-Bataillon 34
 355th Oak Leaves on 17 December 1943 as Oberstleutnant and commander of Panzergrenadier-Regiment 5

References

Citations

Bibliography

 
 

1908 births
2000 deaths
People from Alsace-Lorraine
People from Moselle (department)
Major generals of the German Army (Wehrmacht)
Recipients of the Knight's Cross of the Iron Cross with Oak Leaves
German prisoners of war in World War II held by the United Kingdom